"Ta' mig tilbage" is a song by Danish singer Basim. The song was released in Denmark on 18 February 2011 as a digital download on iTunes. The song has peaked to number 30 on the Danish Singles Chart.

Track listing

Chart performance

Weekly charts

Release  history

References

2011 singles
2011 songs
Basim songs
Universal Music Group singles